The Other Two & You is the debut album by The Other Two, an electronic musical group composed of Gillian Gilbert and Stephen Morris, better known as founders of the group New Order. It was recorded in 1991, but its official release was delayed until late 1993 due to the collapse of Factory Records. Early promo copies from Factory Records were released in 1992 and referred to as FACT-330. The album was re-released with additional remixes in January 2010 by LTM Recordings.

Track listing
 Written by Gillian Gilbert and Stephen Morris

 Although "Loved It (The Other Track)" is not strictly a hidden track, it is separated from the preceding track by a silent pregap lasting a full minute.

Personnel
 Gillian Gilbert - lead vocals, keyboards, guitar
 Stephen Morris - drums, percussion, keyboards
 Jeremy (Jez) Kerr – backing vocals and lyrics on "Tasty Fish"
 Andy Wroe – guitars on "Movin' On"
 John Jackson, Felix Kendall, Stuart James, Simon Gogerly, Yoyo, Noel Rafferty, Chris Potter, Richard Chappell – engineering
 Thomas Manss, Howard Wakefield @ Thomas Manss & Company – sleeve design
 Peter Saville – design consultant
 Neil Cooper, Craig McDean – photography

Release history

References

External links
Worldinmotion.net

1993 debut albums
The Other Two albums
Albums produced by Stephen Hague
London Records albums